Notre Dame de Mongré High School is a private Roman Catholic school in Villefranche-sur-Saône, Rhône, France. Located in the Archdiocese of Lyon, the school was founded by Mademoiselle de La Barmondière in 1848 as a Jesuit school.

Mongré currently enrolls just over 2,000 students from elementary school to high school and is proud to achieve high grades and results for the baccalaureat (most of years, 100% of the students pass). A large majority of each graduating class goes on to attend a university or college.

See also

 Catholic Church in France
 Education in France
 List of Jesuit schools

References

Educational institutions established in 1848
Jesuit secondary schools in France
Jesuit elementary and primary schools in France
1848 establishments in France